Luc-Primaube is a railway station in Luc-la-Primaube, Occitanie, France. The station opened in 1902 and is located on the Castelnaudary–Rodez line. The station is served by TER (local) services operated by SNCF.

Train services
The following services currently call at Luc-Primaube:
local service (TER Occitanie) Toulouse–Albi–Rodez

References

Railway stations in France opened in 1902
Railway stations in Aveyron